The Firefighters Memorial Walk, formerly known as the Sara Killey Memorial Walk, is organised each year by the Isle of Man Fire and Rescue Service. Proceeds go to The Firefighters Charity, which provides assistance to serving and retired fire service staff and their families.

In subsequent years the walk has followed the Parish Walk course from Peel Fire Station, via Kirk Michael Fire Station and finishing at Ramsey Fire Station, a distance of exactly . Later, the walk was renamed Sara Killey Memorial Walk in memory of former fire service worker Sara Killey who died in 2007. In 2016, the walk was again renamed the Firefighters Memorial Walk, in memory not only of Sara but also other colleagues and friends with a close association to the Isle of Man Fire and Rescue Service.

It is regarded as an ideal warm up for the full  Parish Walk which takes place two months later.

In 2018, the race was won David Mapp in 4 hours, 43 minutes and 45 seconds. The women's race was won by Hannah Hunter in a record time of 5 hours, 11 minutes and 6 seconds by a woman and she finished in 3rd position overall.

Past winners

References 

Challenge walks
Walking in the Isle of Man
Annual events in the Isle of Man
2008 establishments in the Isle of Man
Recurring events established in 2008
Spring (season) events in the Isle of Man